Deborah Rose may refer to:
Deborah Bird Rose (1946–2018), Australia-based ethnographer
Debi Rose, member of the New York City Council